The 2011 Challenge de France Final was the 10th final of France's female football cup competition. The final took place on 21 May 2011 at the Stade de la Pépinière in Poitiers and was contested between D1 Féminine clubs Saint-Étienne and Montpellier. This was the last final under the Challenge de France name as the competition will be renamed to the Coupe de France Feminine for the 2011–12 season and onwards.

In the match, Saint-Étienne recorded a historic upset defeating Montpellier 3–2 on penalties after the match ended 0–0 in both regular time and extra time. The title is Saint-Étienne's first Challenge de France in the club's history and its first major honour since joining the AS Saint-Étienne in 2008.

News

Team backgrounds 

Saint-Étienne made its debut in the ultimate match of the competition. In its run-up to the final, the club faced only one first division club, Le Mans in the quarter-finals, and defeated the club 1–0. Saint-Étienne also did not concede a goal in the competition having shut out all of its opponents. Montpellier made its fifth appearance in the final of the Challenge de France, which is only second to Lyon, which has appeared in seven. Of its five appearances, Montpellier have won the Challenge de France three times; tied for the most titles ever won in the competition with Lyon. The club won its first titles in back-to-back seasons from 2006–2007 when it defeated Lyon two consecutive years on penalties. Montpellier won its last title in 2009. The club defeated Le Mans 3–1 in the final. The three-time champions only conceded one goal in the competition having outscored its opponents 22–1.

Road to the final

Match

Match details

References

External links 
 Official site

2010–11 in French women's football
2011
Association football penalty shoot-outs
May 2011 sports events in France
Sport in Poitiers